Jan Andreas Schmid (born 24 November 1983) is a Norwegian former nordic combined skier, of Swiss origin. He won two medals at the FIS Nordic World Ski Championships 2009 in Liberec with a silver in the 10 km individual normal hill event and a bronze in the 4 x 5 km team event. Competing two Winter Olympics for Switzerland, he earned his best finish of fourth in the 4 x 5 km team event at Turin in 2006. Schmid also competed in two World Championships for Switzerland. At the 2010 Winter Olympics for Norway, he finished fifth in the 4 x 5 km team event.

Background
Schmid was born in Norway, speaks Norwegian, and has lived in city of Trondheim all of his life. Until 2006 he only had a Swiss passport due to the fact that both of his parents (Rudolf and Ruth Schmid), are Swiss citizens.

Change of nationality

The circumstances of Schmid's transfer from the Swiss to the Norwegian Ski Federation are unusual and were discussed at the International Ski Federation Council meeting in 2006. The Swiss ski federation required that Schmid pay a transfer fee of 120,000 Norwegian kroner (approximately US$23,000) as compensation. Transfer fees of this kind are unheard of in the ski sport. The consequences of not paying the fee would have left Schmid in quarantine for a year. It was also a matter of some urgency for Schmid due to the legal complications that could arise if he did not change his nationality before his 23rd birthday.

Family
Schmid's mother, Ruth Schmid, is the leader of the Nordic combined committee in the Norwegian Ski Federation. Jan's five years younger brother, Tommy Schmid, is currently on the Swiss national ski team. He also has a nine years younger sister, Marit Schmid. Their father, Rudolf, is a ski-trainer in Jan and Tommy's skiteam Sjetne IL. The entire family are active in the sport of orienteering. They are all members of a club called Trollelg Orienteeringclub, which is the local club of southern Trondheim.

Record

World Championship

World Cup wins

References

External links
 
 
 
  
 

1983 births
Living people
Sportspeople from Trondheim
Naturalised citizens of Norway
Nordic combined skiers at the 2002 Winter Olympics
Nordic combined skiers at the 2006 Winter Olympics
Nordic combined skiers at the 2010 Winter Olympics
Nordic combined skiers at the 2018 Winter Olympics
Norwegian male Nordic combined skiers
Olympic Nordic combined skiers of Norway
Olympic Nordic combined skiers of Switzerland
Swiss male Nordic combined skiers
FIS Nordic World Ski Championships medalists in Nordic combined
Universiade medalists in nordic combined
Olympic silver medalists for Norway
Olympic medalists in Nordic combined
Medalists at the 2018 Winter Olympics
Universiade bronze medalists for Switzerland
Competitors at the 2005 Winter Universiade